The Museu d'Art Jaume Morera (Jaume Morera Art Museum) is a museum in Lleida (Catalonia) created by the Diputació de Lleida and the Lleida City Council (La Paeria) with the collaboration of the painter Jaume Morera i Galícia. It  is the museum of modern and contemporary art of the city of Lleida. Today is municipally owned and receives financial support from the Diputació de Lleida and the Department of Culture of the Generalitat of Catalonia. Its entrance is free.

References

Further reading 
 Navarro, Jesús. La difusió dels museus monogràfics: El cas del Museu d'Art Jaume Morera. Urtx ISSN 1130-0574.

External links 

 Official website

Lleida
Art museums and galleries in Catalonia